The following is a list of notable events and releases of the year 1897 in Norwegian music.

Events

Deaths

Births

  April 
 17 – Harald Sæverud, organist, composer, and conductor (died 1992).

See also
 1897 in Norway
 Music of Norway

References

 
Norwegian music
Norwegian
Music
1890s in Norwegian music